The 1985–1988 Rugby League World Cup involved players from the national rugby league football teams of five countries: Australia, France, Great Britain, New Zealand and Papua New Guinea. As the World Cup was played over four years during normal international tours, these groups of players never assembled in one place as an entire squad.

Australia
Coaches:  Bob Fulton
 Tim Brasher
 Willie Carne
 Steve Renouf
 Mal Meninga (c)
 Michael Hancock
 Brad Fittler 
 Allan Langer 
 Glenn Lazarus
 Steve Walters
 Mark Sargent
 Paul Sironen
 Bob Lindner
 Bradley Clyde 
 Chris Johns
 John Cartwright
 David Gillespie
 Kevin Walters
 Gary Belcher
 Michael O'Connor  
 Tony Currie
 Wally Lewis
 Des Hasler  
 Sam Backo
 Tony Currie 
 Paul Vautin 
 Bruce McGuire
 Dale Shearer
 Mark Carroll  
 Alan Langer
 Andrew Ettingshausen
 Martin Bella
 Brad Mackay
 Laurie Daley
 Kerrod Walters
 Mark McGaw
 Cliff Lyons
 Greg Alexander
 Ricky Stuart
 Ben Elias
 Rod Wishart
 Craig Salvatori
 Mark Geyer
 Geoff Toovey
 Gary Coyne
 Scott Gourley

France
Coach:  Jacques Jorda/ Michel Mazaré
Pierre Aillères (Toulouse Olympique)
Adolphe Alésina (XIII Catalan)
Christophe Auroy (XIII Catalan)
Abdrajah Baba (XIII Catalan)
Jean-Marc Balleroy (Avignon)
Pascal Bomati (XIII Catalan)
Christophe Bonnafous (Albi)
Alain Bouzer (Pamiers)
Gérard Boyals (Saint-Gaudens)
Thierry Bernabé (Le Pontet)
Denis Biénès (Saint-Gaudens)
Thierry Buttignol (Avignon)
Didier Cabestany (XIII Catalan)
Éric Castel (Albi)
Pierre Chamorin (Saint-Estève)
Philippe Chiron (Carpentras)
Régis Courty
Guy Delaunay (XIII Catalan)
Lindsay Delpech (Pamiers)
David Despin (Villeneuve-sur-Lot)
Daniel Divet (Carcassonne)
Gilles Dumas (Saint-Gaudens)
Patrick Entat (Avignon)
Pascal Fages (Pia)
Philippe Fourquet (Saint-Gaudens)
David Fraisse (Carcassonne)
Jean-Marc Garcia (Saint-Estève)
Mathieu Khedimi (Saint-Estève)
Patrick Limongi (Carcassonne)
Bernard Llong (XIII Catalan)
Francis Lope (Toulouse)
Jean-Pierre Magnac
Patrick Marginet  (Saint-Estève)
Jacques Moliner (Pamiers)
Pierre Montgaillard (XIII Catalan)
Roger Palisses (Saint-Estève)
Jacques Pech (Pia)
Bertrand Planté (Villeneuve-sur-Lot)
Cyrille Pons (Saint-Gaudens)
Jean-Philippe Pougeau (Saint-Estève)
Jean-Luc Rabot (Villeneuve-sur-Lot)
Hugues Ratier (Lézignan)
Éric Rémirez (Carcassonne)
Franck Romano (Carpentras)
Jean Ruiz (Saint-Estève)
Claude Sirvent (Saint-Gaudens)
Yves Storer (Saint-Gaudens)
Marc Tisseyre (Carcassonne)
Patrick Torreilles (Pia)
Thierry Valéro (Lézignan)
Daniel Verdès (Vileneuve-sur-Lot)
Yves Villoni (Pamiers)
Robert Vizcay (Saint-Gaudens)

Great Britain
Coach:  Malcolm Reilly
Alan Tait
Phil Ford
Paul Newlove
Paul Loughlin
Martin Offiah
Shaun Edwards
David Hulme
Paul Hulme
Kelvin Skerrett
Andy Platt
Andy Goodway
Roy Powell
Mike Gregory
Joe Lydon
Keith England
Karl Fairbank
Paul Dixon
Jonathan Davies
Paul Moriarty
Michael Jackson
Daryl Powell
Denis Betts
Lee Jackson
Paul Eastwood
Carl Gibson
Steve Hampson
Ellery Hanley
Bobbie Goulding
Garry Schofield
Shaun Irwin
St John Ellis
Ian Lucas
Richie Eyres
Les Holliday
Mark Aston
Karl Harrison
Gary Price
Gary Connolly
Martin Dermott
Phil Clarke
Graham Steadman
Billy McGinty

New Zealand
Coach:  Tony Gordon/ Bob Bailey Howie Tamati
Richie Blackmore
Frano Botica
Peter Brown
Dean Clark 
Morvin Edwards 
Mark Elia 
Esene Faimalo
Gary Freeman
Clayton Friend
James Goulding
Daryl Halligan
Gavin Hill
Sean Hoppe
Mark Horo  
Kevin Iro  
Tony Iro 
Tony Kemp 
Emosi Koloto 
Mike Kuiti
Francis Leota
Dean Lonergan 
Duane Mann 
George Mann
Jarrod McCracken 
Hugh McGahan
Gary Mercer
Tawera Nikau
Mark Nixon
Sam Panapa
Mike Patton 
Quentin Pongia 
Matthew Ridge
Tea Ropati
Kelly Shelford 
Kurt Sherlock 
Kurt Sorensen 
Sam Stewart
Brent Stuart 
Brent Todd
Paddy Tuimavave
Brendon Tuuta 
Dave Watson 
Darrell Williams 
Jason Williams 
Mark Woods

Papua New Guinea
Coach:  Skerry Palanga
Ipisa Wanega
Arnold Krewanty
Phillip Boge
Bal Numapo
Mea Morea
Stanley Haru
Gigmai Ongugo
Ati Lomutopa
Michael Matmillo
Tuiyo Evei
Joe Gispe
Arebo Taumaku
Michael Angara
Max Tiri
Chris Itam
Kes Paglipari
Matthew Elara
Opoe Soga
Bobby Ako
Goie Waine
Elias Kamiak
Paul Gela
James Naipo
Bernard Bate
John Unagi
Thomas Daki
Joshua Kououru
Johannes Kola
Liprin Palangat
Richard Wagambie - (Carpentras (France)
Korul Sinemau
Danny Moi
Daroa Ben-Moide
Ngala Lapan
Kera Ngaffin
Tuksy Karu
Leslie Hoffman
Nande Yer
John Piel
Aquila Emil
Ben Biri
Kini Tani
Sauna Babago
James Kapia
Joe Rema

External links
World Cup 1989-1992 at Rugby League Project

1989 in rugby league
1990 in rugby league
1991 in rugby league
1992 in rugby league
Squads
Rugby League World Cup squads